Daisy Martey is a British singer, songwriter, playwright and screenwriter. She is the lead vocalist for Noonday Underground.  Late in 2004, Martey left the band to become the lead singer of Morcheeba, replacing their former singer, Skye Edwards. Martey recorded the vocals for Morcheeba's fifth studio album, The Antidote, which was released in May 2005.

In 2007, she was named in Sonia Boyce's Devotional series  celebrating iconic Black British singers alongside distinguished artists such as Sade and Shirley Bassey in an exhibition by the National Portrait Gallery.

References

External links 
Official Daisy Martey Page on Myspace
Official Noonday Underground Page on Myspace

Living people
Year of birth missing (living people)
British women singers